Ebadur Rahman is a Bengali novelist and award-winning filmmaker.

Biography 
Ebadur Rahman curated Bangladeshi artists including Ronni Ahmmed at the 14th and 15th edition of the Open International Exhibition of Sculpture and Installations in Venice, Lido and in the San Servolo Island.

Ebadur Rahman's directorial debut Atrocity Exhibition premiered in the Short Film Corner of the Festival de Cannes, 2013.

Alpha
Ebadur Rahman co-wrote the screenplay for the feature-length film Alpha, which Bangladesh has selected as its submission for the international feature film category at the 2020 Oscars.

Atrocity Exhibition 
Ebadur Rahman's directorial debut Atrocity Exhibition premiered in the Short Film Corner of the Festival de Cannes, 2013.

Guerilla 
The film Guerrilla received ten Jatio Chalachitra Purushkar or National Awards, two of which were for the screenplay and dialog written by Rahman and his co-writer Nasiruddin Yusuf. Because of a disagreement with the director Rahman left Guerrilla during the production.

Meherjaan
Rahman wrote the initial screenplay for the feature-length film, Meherjaan, but he left the project because of creative differences, and the screenplay was completed by Rubaiyat Hossain.

References

External links 
 Atrocity Exhibition

Bangladeshi male novelists
Living people
Year of birth missing (living people)
Best Screenplay National Film Award (Bangladesh) winners